The Las Mercedes Municipality is one of the 15 municipalities (municipios) that makes up the central Venezuelan state of Guárico and, according to a 2010 population estimate by the National Institute of Statistics of Venezuela, the municipality has a population of 31,825.

Overview
The town of Las Mercedes del Llano is the shire town of the Las Mercedes Municipality.

The Municipality includes the 4.8 km Third Orinoco River Crossing, between Cabruta and Caicara del Orinoco in Bolívar.

See also
Guárico
Municipalities of Venezuela

References

External links
lasmercedes-guarico.gob.ve 

Municipalities of Guárico